Marco Castillo, (born September 19, 1963 in Rio de Janeiro, RJ, Brazil) is a Brazilian-Canadian musician and songwriter based in Winnipeg, Manitoba, Canada and the son of Trio Irakitan guitarist Antônio Santos Cunha.

After graduating with a B.A. in Music from Estácio S.A., Rio de Janeiro in 1994, he began touring South America with some of Brazil's top acts like Brazilian singer Rosa Marya Colin.

Since immigrating to Canada in 2006, Marco Castillo has become a fixture on the Winnipeg music scene, including regular appearances at the annual Jazz Winnipeg Festival.

Music history
Marco Castillo released his debut album, "Brazilian Season" in 2008.

In 2010, CBC Radio Producer Kinsey Posen selected Marco Castillo to be part of the Manitoba Cover Project where new and emerging Manitoban artists covered well known Manitoba composers. Marco Castillo's contribution was a Portuguese version of These Eyes by The Guess Who and Neil Young's Heart of Gold.

In 2012, his second album, "Trip To Brazil" won "World Recording of the Year" in 2012 at the Western Canadian Music Awards in Regina.

In 2014, Marco Castillo became a Canadian citizen and released his 3rd album, "Zabele" which was nominated for "World Recording of the Year" at the Western Canadian Music Awards in Winnipeg.

The song "Forró No Canadá" from "Zabelê" is a tribute to his new homeland in the Forró style of Brazil and a Folkloric Category finalist in the 2015 Viña del Mar International Song Festival at the Festival Viña del Mar 2015:

Playing style
Marco Castillo plays a variety of Latin and World Music styles built on a foundation of jazz.  The sound is as much jazz-infused world music as it is Latin-infused jazz music; one that has appealed to both jazz and world music fans.  The songs are a mix of original compositions, traditional pieces, and standards, and performed solo, as a trio, and with the 8-piece Brazilian Beats.

Discography
Brazilian Season – 2008
Trip To Brazil – 2012 
Zabelê – 2014

References

External links
Marco Castillo official website
 
 
 Marco Castillo's videos on YouTube
 Marco Castillo on iTunes
 Marco Castillo on CDBaby

1963 births
Living people
Musicians from Winnipeg
Canadian guitarists
Brazilian guitarists
Brazilian male guitarists
Canadian people of Brazilian descent
Brazilian emigrants to Canada
Canadian world music musicians
Canadian jazz musicians
Musicians from Rio de Janeiro (city)
Canadian male jazz musicians